Jaime Gomez (born May 18, 1967) is an American professional golfer.

Gomez was born in Arlington, Texas. He played college golf at the University of Houston. He turned professional in 1989.

Gomez has played on a number of professional tours. He played on the Nationwide Tour (1991–92, 1994–98), winning once at the 1992 Ben Hogan Boise Open. His tenth-place finish on the tour money list earned him his PGA Tour card for 1993, where his best finish was T-10 at the Freeport-McMoRan Golf Classic. He also played on the Canadian Tour (1999, 2001, 2005, 2008–11), winning twice: 1999 Telus Calgary Open and 2005 Corona Mazatlan Classic.

Professional wins (4)

Ben Hogan Tour wins (1)

Canadian Tour wins (2)
1999 Telus Calgary Open
2005 Corona Mazatlan Classic

Other wins (1)
1996 Panama Open

Results in major championships

CUT = missed the halfway cut
Note: Gomez only played in the U.S. Open.

See also
1992 Ben Hogan Tour graduates

References

External links

American male golfers
Houston Cougars men's golfers
PGA Tour golfers
Korn Ferry Tour graduates
Golfers from Texas
Sportspeople from Arlington, Texas
People from McAllen, Texas
1967 births
Living people